Loders is a village in Dorset, England. Loders may also refer to:

Places
Australia
 Loders Creek, river in Queensland

England
 Loders and Bothenhampton Liberty, historical administrative area in Dorset
 Loders Priory, historical religious house in Dorset

See also
 Loder, a surname